The  was an administrative district of the Eastern Roman Empire with a seat in Odessus (present-day Varna) established by Emperor Justinian I on May 18, 536.

Territorially, the  contained the Roman provinces of Moesia Inferior and Scythia Minor, located in the lower Danube region, as well as the provinces of Cyprus, Caria, and the Aegean Islands.

By connecting the exposed provinces of the Lower Danube with wealthier provinces in the interior of the empire, Justinian was able to transport supplies via the Black Sea. This territorial restructuring relieved both the destitute populations and the devastated countryside of the Danubian provinces from the burden of sustaining any stationed troops.

Ultimately, the Danubian provinces associated with the  did not survive the Slav and Avar invasions of the Balkans in the 7th century. However, isolated fortresses on the Danube delta and along the coast of the Black Sea were maintained via supplies by sea. This argument has been adopted by some scholars since but challenged by others, notably Helene Ahrweiler in her study of the Byzantine navy. This question is bound up with the discussion on the respective formations' nature as military-naval or civil-administrative entities.

Specifically, thirteen seals (nine of which are from the reign of Justinian) demonstrate that communications between officials from Scythia Minor and Constantinople occurred on a somewhat regular basis.

References

Sources

 
 
 
 
 
 

States and territories established in the 530s
536 establishments
Late Roman provinces
Subdivisions of the Byzantine Empire
Justinian I
Ancient history of Romania
History of Eastern Romance people
History of Varna, Bulgaria